Joseph Siffert (7 July 1936 – 24 October 1971) was a Swiss racing driver.

Affectionately known as "Seppi" to his family and friends, Siffert was born in Fribourg, Switzerland, the son of a dairy owner. He initially made his name in racing on two wheels, winning the Swiss 350 cc motorcycle championship in 1959, before switching to four wheels with a Formula Junior Stanguellini. Siffert graduated to Formula One as a privateer in 1962, with a four-cylinder Lotus-Climax. He later moved to Swiss team Scuderia Filipinetti, and in 1964 joined Rob Walker's private British Rob Walker Racing Team. Early successes included victories in the non-Championship 1964 and 1965 Mediterranean Grands Prix, both times beating Jim Clark by a very narrow margin. He won two races in Formula One for the Rob Walker Racing Team and BRM. He died at the 1971 World Championship Victory Race, having his car roll over after a crash caused by a mechanical failure and being caught under the burning vehicle. Siffert was married twice and to his second wife Simone during the height of his career in the late 1960s and at the time of his death. They had two children together, Véronique and Philippe.

Life and career

Early life 
Siffert was born in 1936 in the town of Fribourg, Switzerland, 35 km (22 mi) from Bern to a poor family. Aged 12, Siffert and his father went to Bern to see the 1948 Swiss Grand Prix at the Bremgarten circuit, and it was at this event where Siffert wanted to be a racing driver.

Formula One 

In 1968, Siffert drove into the F1 history books by winning the 1968 British Grand Prix at Brands Hatch in Rob Walker Racing Team's Lotus 49B, beating Chris Amon's Ferrari into second place after a race-long battle. This is regarded as the last GP victory by a genuine privateer. In 1971 as a BRM team driver he scored his second Formula One Championship race victory at the Austrian Grand Prix held at the Österreichring.

Sports cars 
While Siffert's status in F1 grew slowly, his fame came as a leading driver for the factory Porsche effort in its quest for the World Sportscar Championship. In 1968, Siffert and Hans Herrmann won the 24 Hours of Daytona and the 12 Hours of Sebring in a Porsche 907, marking the first major outright wins for the company, apart from a few earlier victories on twisty tracks.

Later on, Siffert's driving displays in the Porsche 917 earned him several major wins in Europe. In addition, Siffert was chosen by Porsche to help launch its CanAm development programme, driving a Porsche 917PA spyder in 1969 and finishing fourth in the championship despite few entries.

In 1970 he teamed up with Brian Redman to drive a Porsche 908/3 to victory at the Targa Florio. That same year, Porsche bankrolled Siffert's seat in a works March Engineering F1 since the German company did not wish to lose one of their prize drivers to rival Ferrari. His association with March in F1 was disastrous, so he was pleased to join rival Porsche racer Pedro Rodriguez at BRM the following season.

Death 
Siffert was killed in the non-championship World Championship Victory Race at Brands Hatch, Kent, England, the scene of his first victory in 1968. The suspension of his BRM had been damaged in a lap one incident with Ronnie Peterson, and broke later. This was not admitted by BRM until much later when it was accidentally divulged by a BRM ex-mechanic. The BRM crashed and immediately caught fire. Siffert could not free himself from the burning car.

In the subsequent Royal Automobile Club (the UK organising and regulatory representative of the FIA at the time) investigation, it was discovered that Siffert had only suffered a leg fracture in the initial crash but because three fire extinguishers failed to work properly no rescuers could reach Siffert for five minutes and he died of smoke inhalation. A fire marshall stated that if the fire extinguishers worked correctly then they could have reached Siffert within 20 seconds.

This accident led to a rapid overhaul of safety, both in-car and on circuit. On-board fire extinguishers (using BCF—bromochlorodifluoromethane, an aircraft product) became mandatory and also piped air for the drivers, direct into their helmets.

His funeral in Switzerland was attended by 50,000 people and a Gulf-Porsche 917 of Team John Wyer led the hearse and procession through the streets of Fribourg. Benoit was a period Formula 1 sports reporter and knew Siffert well. He was also present at Siffert's tragic last Brands Hatch race in 1971. The night before the race, Benoit took pictures of Siffert, his wife Simone and his mother Maria as well as a friend Jean Tinguely at an evening victory celebration. He then also took the last picture of Siffert alive as he sat waiting in his BRM in the pole position on the starting line five minutes before the start of the race.

Legacy 
In the final round of the 2007–08 A1GP season, at Brands Hatch, the A1 Team Switzerland car carried the message Jo 'Seppi' Siffert - 40th Anniversary - Brands Hatch. This commemorated his 1968 British Grand Prix victory at Brands Hatch.

Racing record

Career summary

 Graded drivers not eligible for European Formula Two Championship points

Complete Formula One World Championship results
(key) (Races in bold indicate pole position; races in italics indicate fastest lap)

Notes
 – Formula Two cars occupied fifth to tenth positions in the 1969 German Grand Prix, however drivers of these cars were not eligible for championship points. The points for fifth and sixth were awarded to the drivers of the eleventh and twelfth placed cars.

Complete Formula One Non-Championship results
(key) (Races in bold indicate pole position; races in italics indicate fastest lap)

Complete 24 Hours of Le Mans results

Complete European Formula Two Championship results
(key) (Races in bold indicate pole position; races in italics indicate fastest lap)

 Graded drivers not eligible for  European Formula Two Championship points

Other results
Targa Florio: 1st, 1970
Coppa Cittá di Enna: 1st, 1968
12 hours of Sebring: 1st, 1968
24 hours of Daytona: 1st, 1968
6 Hours of Nürburgring: 1st, 1968, 1969
6 Hours of Spa-Francorchamps: 1st, 1969, 1970
1000 km of Zeltweg: 1st, 1968, 1969, 1970
1000 km of Monza: 1st, 1969
1000 km of Buenos Aires: 1st, 1971
6 Hours of Watkins Glen: 1st, 1969
1000 km of Brands Hatch: 1st, 1968

References

Sources

F1 Results include information from the following sources:

External links

 Official Jo Siffert web site (German and French) by Philippe Siffert, Jo's son 
 Jo Siffert fan page authorized by Simone Siffert, Jo's second wife
 Biography at der Blick (German)

1936 births
1971 deaths
12 Hours of Reims drivers
24 Hours of Daytona drivers
24 Hours of Le Mans drivers
BRM Formula One drivers
Deaths by smoke inhalation
Formula One race winners
March Formula One drivers
People from Fribourg
Racing drivers who died while racing
Rob Walker Racing Team Formula One drivers
Scuderia Filipinetti Formula One drivers
Siffert Racing Formula One drivers
Sport deaths in England
Swiss motorcycle racers
Swiss racing drivers
Swiss Formula One drivers
World Sportscar Championship drivers
12 Hours of Sebring drivers
Sportspeople from the canton of Fribourg
Porsche Motorsports drivers